Alf's Button is a 1920 British comic novel written by William Aubrey Darlington. A soldier in the British Army comes across a magic button which summons a genie to grant his wishes. It drew inspiration from Thomas Anstey Guthrie's 1900 novel The Brass Bottle.

Adaptations
In 1920 the book was adapted into a silent film Alf's Button which starred Leslie Henson and was directed by W.P. Kellino. The success of the film significantly boosted the book's sales. Darlington adapted his novel for a 1924 play of the same name. In 1930 a sound film adaptation Alf's Button was released, also directed by Kellino. A third film based on the story Alf's Button Afloat was released in 1938 directed by Marcel Varnel and starring Bud Flanagan and Chesney Allen.

References

Bibliography

External links
  

1920 British novels
British novels adapted into films
Novels by William Aubrey Darlington